Sabnie  is a village in Sokołów County, Masovian Voivodeship, in east-central Poland. It is the seat of the gmina (administrative district) called Gmina Sabnie.

References

Sabnie